Mediawatch-UK, formerly known as the National Viewers' and Listeners' Association (National VALA or NVLA), was a pressure group in the United Kingdom, which campaigned against the publication and broadcast of media content that it viewed as harmful and offensive, such as violence, hate speech against any race, creed or sexual orientation, xenophobia, and profanity.

History
NVLA was founded in 1965 by Mary Whitehouse to succeed the earlier Clean-Up TV Campaign, which Whitehouse co-founded with her husband Ernest and the Reverend Basil and Norah Buckland early in the previous year. NVLA Vice President was Christian activist and educationalist, Charles Oxley. Whitehouse remained the group's leader until 1994, when she was succeeded by John Beyer. NVLA changed its name to Mediawatch-UK in 2001.

Mediawatch-UK monitored traditional broadcast channels, as well as social and digital media, published reports about programme content, and responds to Government and other consultations on broadcasting and digital policy. It argued for greater parliamentary accountability in recognising and tackling the risks inherent in digital platforms. It also highlighted the need for both governments and individual households to be proactive, not just reactive, in monitoring risks online.

Previously the organisation was mainly concerned with taste and decency issues but before it closed down on 7th September 2021 it planned to launch a series of initiatives to help promote social cohesion and safety for all children, young adults, and families, irrespective of background and dynamic.

Campaigns

Pornography
Along with around 400 others Mediawatch-UK responded to a Home Office consultation concerning extreme pornography in December 2005. In the Mediawatch-UK response it was suggested that the possession of allegedly "hard-core" pornography, as currently classified R18 by the British Board of Film Classification and, therefore, legally sold in high street sex shops (R18 classification), should be included in the range of extreme pornography that is the subject of the Home Office consultation. It is proposed that possession of extreme material would become a criminal offence punishable by up to 3 years in prison.

References

External links

UK Charity Commission registered number: 1145460 - CHILDREN AND FAMILIES MEDIA EDUCATION TRUST (a.k.a. "MEDIAWATCH UK") - working in Scotland
Companies House info on company number: 07719477 - CHILDREN AND FAMILIES MEDIA EDUCATION TRUST (a.k.a. "MEDIAWATCH UK"). Incorporated: 27 July 2011. Nature of business: Other education not elsewhere classified
The official mediawatch-uk website
Home Office report, 2016-17

Lobbying organisations in the United Kingdom
Organizations established in 1965
Organizations disestablished in 2021
Political advocacy groups in the United Kingdom
Censorship of broadcasting in the United Kingdom
Television organisations in the United Kingdom
1965 establishments in the United Kingdom
2021 disestablishments in the United Kingdom